Nabdam District is one of the fifteen districts in Upper East Region, Ghana. Originally it was formerly part of the then-larger Talensi-Nabdam District in August 2004, until the northern part of the district was split off to create Nabdam District on 28 June 2012; thus the remaining part has been renamed as Talensi District. The district assembly is located in the central part of Upper East Region and has Nangodi as its capital town.

References 

Districts of Upper East Region